Pamplie is a commune in the Deux-Sèvres department in western France, located roughly 23 km (15 miles) to the north of Niort.

See also
Communes of the Deux-Sèvres department

References

Communes of Deux-Sèvres